The 1985 Limerick Senior Hurling Championship was the 91st staging of the Limerick Senior Hurling Championship since its establishment by the Limerick County Board.

Patrickswell were the defending champions.

On 8 September 1985, Kilmallock won the championship after a 3-12 to 1-13 defeat of South Liberties in the final. It was their sixth championship title overall and their first title in ten championship seasons.

Results

Final

Championship statistics

Top scorers

Miscellaneous
 Kilmallock win their first title since 1975

References

Limerick Senior Hurling Championship
Limerick Senior Hurling Championship